Enniscaven is a hamlet that lies  north-west of St Austell in Cornwall, England. Enniscaven is in the civil parish of St Dennis.  The village is near to Goss Moor which is the largest continuous mire complex in south-west Britain. Goss Moor is part of the Goss And Tregoss Moors Site of Special Scientific Interest (SSSI) which is also a Special Area of Conservation (SAC).

References

Hamlets in Cornwall